Arthur Jauan Brown Sr. (born June 30, 1997) is an American football wide receiver for the Philadelphia Eagles of the National Football League (NFL). He played college football at Ole Miss and was drafted by the Tennessee Titans in the second round of the 2019 NFL Draft.

High school career
Brown attended Starkville High School in Starkville, Mississippi, where he played football and baseball. As a senior at Starkville, he recorded 83 catches for 1,371 yards and 13 touchdowns and led his team to a 6A state championship. He was named first-team All-State by USA Today, The Clarion-Ledger's Dandy Dozen, and the Mississippi Association of Coaches.

As a top recruit in both football and baseball, Brown became the second player after Kyler Murray, to play in both the Under Armour All-America Football Game and the Under Armour All-America Baseball Game. In the 2016 Under Armour All-America Game, he caught four passes for 79 yards and a touchdown.

Recruiting
Brown was a consensus 4-star prospect by the major recruiting services. He was ranked the No. 45 overall recruit by Scout, No. 47 by 247Sports, No. 53 by Rivals and No. 66 by ESPN. He was also listed as the No. 5 wide receiver prospect in the country by 247Sports and Scout and was ranked the second-best player in the state by 247Sports and third-best by Scout. On February 3, 2016, Brown committed to play both college baseball and college football at the University of Mississippi.

College career
Brown was drafted as an outfielder by the San Diego Padres in the 19th round of the 2016 Major League Baseball Draft. He signed with the Padres, which prevented him from playing baseball at Ole Miss, but he was still eligible to play football. At Ole Miss, he majored in General Studies with an emphasis in Education, Journalism and Legal Studies.

2016 season
In Brown's first game of his collegiate career, he started and recorded two catches for 48 yards against Wofford. As a true freshman at Ole Miss in 2016, Brown played in all 12 games and finished fifth on the team with 29 receptions for 412 yards and two touchdowns. He finished fourth among SEC freshmen with 2.4 catches per game and fifth with 34.3 receiving yards per game.

2017 season
During the first game of his sophomore season in 2017, Brown hauled in eight catches, two of which were touchdowns of 71 and 77 yards. He tied the school record with 14 receptions against Louisiana along with 185 yards and 2 touchdowns, and set the school record for receiving yards in a game with 233 against South Alabama (later broken by Elijah Moore).

Brown finished the season with 75 receptions for a school record 1,252 yards and a school-record-tying 11 touchdowns (shared with Laquon Treadwell) in 12 games, leading the team and the SEC. He was awarded the Conerly Trophy, given to the best college football player in the state of Mississippi.

2018 season
Brown's 2018 junior season was shared with future NFL Pro-bowler DK Metcalf and was highlighted by 9 receptions for 212 yards (at the time, second in school history only to his own record the previous year) and a touchdown against Vanderbilt. Brown again led the team and the SEC in receiving, finishing with a school-record 85 receptions (later passed by Moore) and 1,320 yards (still the record) and six touchdowns. He again had six 100-yard receiving games, tying his own record (shared with Treadwell and later Moore). He was named first-team All-SEC for the second consecutive year.

Following the 2018 season, Brown announced he would forgo his senior year and enter the 2019 NFL Draft. , he was the Ole Miss' all-time leader in receiving yards and 100-yard games (12).

Collegiate statistics

Professional career

Tennessee Titans
Brown was selected by the Tennessee Titans in the second round (51st overall) of the 2019 NFL Draft. He was the fourth of 29 receivers taken in the draft, just 13 picks ahead of teammate DK Metcalf. On June 12, 2019, he signed a four-year deal worth $5,641,199 with a signing bonus of $2,122,690 and a 2019 cap hit of $1,025,670.

2019 season
Brown made his NFL debut in the Titans' season-opener against the Cleveland Browns. In the game, he caught three passes for 100 yards in the 43–13 road victory. During Week 4 against the Atlanta Falcons, he caught his first two NFL touchdowns from Marcus Mariota in the 24–10 road victory. He finished the game with three receptions for 94 yards and the two aforementioned touchdowns. During Week 8 against the Tampa Bay Buccaneers, he caught an eight-yard touchdown in the 27–23 victory. In Week 12 against the Jacksonville Jaguars, Brown caught four receptions for 135 yards and a touchdown as the Titans won 42–20. In the next game against the Indianapolis Colts, he caught three passes for 45 yards in the 31–17 road victory.

During Week 14 against the Oakland Raiders, he caught five passes for 153 yards and two touchdowns, including a 91-yard touchdown, during the 42–21 road victory. In the following game against the Houston Texans, Brown caught eight passes for 114 yards and a touchdown during the 24–21 loss. In the next game against the New Orleans Saints, he rushed for a 49-yard touchdown and caught a 34-yard reception during the 38–28 loss. In the regular-season finale against the Texans, Brown caught four passes for 124 yards and a touchdown during the 35–14 road victory to help the Titans clinch a playoff berth. In his rookie season, Brown finished with 52 receptions for 1,051 receiving yards (leading all NFL rookies) and eight receiving touchdowns, causing some to regard him as "the steal of the 2019 draft". In three postseason games, Brown totaled five receptions for 64 yards as the Titans' season ended with a 35–24 loss in the AFC Championship to the Kansas City Chiefs.

2020 season

In a Tuesday night game in Week 5 against the Buffalo Bills, Brown recorded seven catches for 82 yards and his first receiving touchdown of the season during the 42–16 win. In Week 6 against the Houston Texans, Brown had five receptions for 58 yards and two touchdowns in the 42–36 overtime victory. During Week 7 against the Pittsburgh Steelers, Brown finished with 153 receiving yards, including a 74-yard touchdown as the Titans lost 24–27.
In Week 9 against the Chicago Bears, Brown recorded four catches for 101 yards, including a 40-yard touchdown reception, during the 24–17 win.
In Week 12 against the Indianapolis Colts, Brown recorded four catches for 98 yards, including a 69-yard touchdown reception, and returned an onside kick for a touchdown during the 45–26 win.
In Week 14 against the Jacksonville Jaguars, Brown recorded seven catches for 112 yards and a touchdown during the 31–10 victory.
In Week 17 against the Houston Texans, Brown recorded ten catches for 151 yards and a touchdown during the 41–38 win. Brown had suffered injuries to both of his knees early in the season, causing him to miss two games. He underwent successful surgery to both of his knees January 19, 2021.

2021 season
Brown entered the 2021 season as the starting wide receiver alongside Julio Jones. In Week 8, he had ten receptions for 155 receiving yards and a touchdown against the Indianapolis Colts. He suffered a chest injury in Week 11 and was placed on injured reserve on November 27, 2021. He was activated on December 23. In his first game back from injury, Brown recorded 11 receptions for 145 yards and a touchdown against the San Francisco 49ers. Overall, Brown finished the 2021 season with 63 receptions for 869 receiving yards and five receiving touchdowns in 13 games.

In the Divisional Round against the Cincinnati Bengals, he had five receptions for 142 yards and one touchdown in the 19-16 loss.

Philadelphia Eagles

On April 28, 2022, during the 2022 NFL Draft, Brown was traded to the Philadelphia Eagles for the 18th overall pick in the 2022 draft, which the Titans used to select wide receiver Treylon Burks from Arkansas, a player widely compared to Brown. Tennessee also received a third-round pick. Brown signed a four-year, $100 million contract with the Eagles after the trade, with $57 million guaranteed. The trade was opposed by Titans head coach Mike Vrabel, contributed to a decrease of 60 receptions and 860 yards among Titans wide receivers through 13 weeks, and was one reason for the Titans decision to fire general manager Jon Robinson at that point in the season.

Brown set the franchise record for most receiving yards in a player’s debut in Week 1 against the Detroit Lions, finishing with 155 yards on 10 receptions in a 38-35 victory.  Against the Pittsburgh Steelers in Week 8, Brown recorded six receptions for 156 yards, including a career-high three touchdown receptions. In a Week 13 blowout of the Tennessee Titans, Brown recorded eight receptions for 119 yards and two touchdowns against his former team. In Week 15, against the Chicago Bears, he had nine receptions for 181 receiving yards in the 25–20 victory. In the 2022 season, Brown had 88 receptions for 1,496 receiving yards and 11 receiving touchdowns. Brown set a single-season franchise record for receiving yards.

In Super Bowl LVII against the Kansas City Chiefs, Brown had six catches for 96 yards and a touchdown in the 38–35 loss.

NFL career statistics

Regular season

Postseason

Personal life
Brown is a Christian.

In 2022, Brown provided vocals on the Christmas album A Philly Special Christmas.

References

External links

Philadelphia Eagles bio
Ole Miss Rebels bio

1997 births
Living people
Sportspeople from Starkville, Mississippi
Players of American football from Mississippi
American football wide receivers
Starkville High School alumni
Ole Miss Rebels football players
Tennessee Titans players
American Conference Pro Bowl players
Philadelphia Eagles players
National Conference Pro Bowl players